Group C of UEFA Euro 2008 was played from 9 to 17 June 2008. All six group matches were played at venues in Switzerland, in Zürich and Berne. The group was composed of 2006 FIFA World Cup finalists Italy and France, as well as the Netherlands and Romania. At the time of the draw, these countries' respective Elo rankings among European teams were 1st, 2nd, 4th and 8th, and as such the group had been dubbed the competition's "group of death".

The Netherlands became the first team from Group C to qualify for the quarter-finals. In their first match, they beat the world champions Italy 3–0, in a display of counter-attacking football. Then, in their second game, they also beat the 2006 World Cup runners-up, France, by a 4–1 scoreline. This left the French in a difficult position, having already played out a scoreless draw against Romania in the group's opening match. Romania also played out a draw against Italy in their second match, leaving them in second place going into the final round of group matches.

Italy finished as the second quarter-finalists, after they beat France 2–0 in their final game. French defender Eric Abidal was sent off just over a quarter of the way through the game for a foul on Luca Toni in the area; Andrea Pirlo converted the resulting penalty. Daniele De Rossi added the second goal from a deflected free kick just after the hour mark. Because of the Italian win, Romania had to beat the Netherlands to qualify for the next round, but they were undone by a Klaas-Jan Huntelaar goal just after half-time, before Robin van Persie scored his second of the tournament three minutes from the end.

Despite the perceived strength of its teams, Group C was the only group at Euro 2008 from which no side made it past the quarter-finals; Italy went out in a penalty shoot-out to eventual winners Spain and the Netherlands lost against Russia after extra time.

Teams

Notes

Standings

In the quarter-finals,
The winner of Group C, Netherlands, advanced to play the runner-up of Group D, Russia.
The runner-up of Group C, Italy, advanced to play the winner of Group D, Spain.

Matches

Romania vs France

Netherlands vs Italy

Italy vs Romania

Netherlands vs France

Netherlands vs Romania

France vs Italy

References

External links
UEFA Euro 2008 Group C

Group C
group
Group
Group
group
UEFA Euro 2008 C